The fourth season of the television series True Blood contains 12 episodes, bringing the series total to 48. The season premiered on June 26, 2011. Though the storyline picks up twelve and a half months after the events of season three; the season still begins immediately after final scene of "Evil Is Going On". It is loosely based on the fourth novel in The Southern Vampire Mysteries series, Dead to the World.

Episodes

Production 
Filming for season four commenced in Los Angeles, California, on December 1, 2010.

As a special promotional broadcast, the season's second episode "You Smell Like Dinner" was made available on HBO Go a week earlier than usual. This, combined with the 4th of July holiday, is theorized to account for the dramatic decline in ratings for that particular episode.

The series hit record high ratings with episode 9 of season 4, titled "Let's Get Out of Here". The episode drew 5.53 million viewers, making it the most watched episode of True Blood to date.

Cast and characters

Main cast

 Anna Paquin as Sookie Stackhouse
 Stephen Moyer as Bill Compton
 Sam Trammell as Sam Merlotte
 Ryan Kwanten as Jason Stackhouse
 Rutina Wesley as Tara Thornton
 Alexander Skarsgård as Eric Northman
 Kevin Alejandro as Jesus Velasquez
 Marshall Allman as Tommy Mickens
 Chris Bauer as Andy Bellefleur
 Kristin Bauer van Straten as Pamela Swynford De Beaufort
 Lauren Bowles as Holly Cleary
 Nelsan Ellis as Lafayette Reynolds
 Janina Gavankar as Luna Garza
 Todd Lowe as Terry Bellefleur
 Joe Manganiello as Alcide Herveaux
 Jim Parrack as Hoyt Fortenberry
 Carrie Preston as Arlene Fowler Bellefleur
 Fiona Shaw as Marnie Stonebrook
 Jessica Tuck as Nan Flanagan
 Deborah Ann Woll as Jessica Hamby

Special Guest cast

 Brit Morgan as Debbie Pelt
 Lois Smith as Adele Stackhouse
 Adina Porter as Lettie Mae Daniels
 Evan Rachel Wood as Sophie-Anne Leclerq
 Gary Cole as Earl Stackhouse

Recurring cast

 Dean Chekvala as Roy
 Fiona Dourif as Casey
 Paola Turbay as Antonia Gavilán de Logroño
 Dale Raoul as Maxine Fortenberry
 Courtney Ford as Portia Bellefleur
 Vedette Lim as Naomi
 Brendan McCarthy as Nate
 Chloe Noelle as Emma Garza
 Alexandra Breckenridge as Katerina Pelham
 Nondumiso Tembe as Mavis
 Tara Buck as Ginger
 Dane DeHaan as Timbo
 Alec Gray as Coby Fowler
Lindsay Pulsipher as Crystal Norris
 James Harvey Ward as Felton Norris
 Laurel Weber as Lisa Fowler
 Del Zamora as Don Bartolo
 Chris Butler as Emory
 J. Smith-Cameron as Melinda Mickens
 Christina Moore as Susanne McKittrick
 Lara Pulver as Claudine
 Chris Coy as Barry Horowitz
 Scott Foley as Patrick Devins
 Katherine Helmond as Caroline Bellefleur
 Neil Hopkins as Claude
 Allan Hyde as Godric
 Michael McMillian as Reverend Steve Newlin
 Michael Raymond-James as Rene Lenier
 John Rezig as Deputy Kevin Ellis
 Rebecca Wisocky as Queen Mab

Casting
On November 8, 2010, Deadline reported that Irish stage actress/director Fiona Shaw (best known in the United States for her role as Aunt Petunia in the Harry Potter films) had been cast as Marnie, an insecure and timid palm reader who is possessed by the spirit of a powerful witch. Former Dexter star Courtney Ford has been cast in the recurring role of Portia Bellefleur, sister to Andy. Actor Dane DeHaan (In Treatment) has also been cast as Timbo. On November 23, Deadline reported that actress Jessica Tuck, who portrays vampire spokesperson Nan Flanagan, will be promoted to series regular starting this season. Three new female cast members were announced: Janina Gavankar (The L Word, The Gates) will play a public school teacher named Luna, who is also a shapeshifter; Alexandra Breckenridge (Life Unexpected, Family Guy) will play a wiccan named Katie; and relative newcomer Vedette Lim will play Naomi, a fierce cage fighter. Daniel Buran will play Marcus, the pack master of the Shreveport werewolves and Alcide's superior and, as in the previous season, Allan Hyde will reprise his role as Godric. Gary Cole (Office Space, Harvey Birdman: Attorney at Law) will play Earl Stackhouse.

Ratings

References 

2011 American television seasons
True Blood
Films about spirit possession